Junonia zonalis, the northern tropical buckeye, is a species in the butterfly family Nymphalidae. It is found in Florida, the Caribbean, Mexico, Central America, and tropical South America.  Junonia zonalis and Junonia nigrosuffusa were formerly subspecies of Junonia evarete, the tropical buckeye, but were elevated to the species rank as a result of phylogenetic and DNA research. As a result, the geographic range of Junonia evarete is limited primarily to South America.

References

Further reading

 

Junonia
Butterflies described in 1867